Federal elections were held in Germany on 6 June 1920. Territorial disputes meant that voting was delayed in East Prussia and Schleswig-Holstein until 20 February 1921, and until 19 November 1922 in Oppeln. The Social Democratic Party remained the largest party in the Reichstag although it lost over a third of its seats. Voter turnout was about 79.2%.

Electoral system 
The members of the Reichstag were elected by two methods. A total of 35 multi-member constituencies were to have representatives elected via party-list proportional representation. A party was entitled to a seat via this method for every 60,000 votes they obtained in a constituency. At the second level, the 35 constituencies were combined into 17 constituency associations. A party could claim an additional seat if its vote remainder in the electoral district after distribution of seats by the first method was more than 30,000. As seats were allocated based on vote count, there was not a set number of seats in the chamber. 

People who were under the age of 25, incapacitated according to the Civil Code, who were under guardianship or provisional guardianship, or who had lost their civil rights of honour after a criminal court ruling were not eligible to vote.

Results

References

Germany
German
Elections in the Weimar Republic
Federal elections in Germany
June 1920 events